William Duff may refer to:

 William Duff, 1st Earl Fife (1696–1763), Scottish peer
 William Duff (cricketer) (1890–1953), South African soldier and cricketer
 William Duff (writer) (1732–1815), historically influential Scottish writer on genius and creativity
 William E. Duff, author
 William J. Duff (1856–1922), American football player
 William Duff (Canadian politician) (1872–1953), merchant and politician in Nova Scotia, Canada
 William Duff (Newfoundland politician) (1842–1913), Newfoundland merchant and politician
 William Duff (dentist) (born 1962), Scottish dentist
 Willie Duff (1935–2004), Scottish footballer
 William Duff (Arabist) (1922–2014) Scottish Arabist and banker, known to be one of the architects of modern Dubai
 Bill Duff (born 1974), NFL footballer